Pāora Temuera  (1886–1957) was a notable New Zealand Anglican priest. Of Māori descent, he identified with the Ngāti Whakaue and Te Arawa iwi. He was born at Ohinemutu, Rotorua, New Zealand, in about 1886.

In the 1950 King's Birthday Honours, Temuera was appointed a Member of the Order of the British Empire for services to the Māori people.

References

1886 births
1957 deaths
New Zealand Māori religious leaders
New Zealand Anglican priests
Ngāti Whakaue people
Te Arawa people
New Zealand Members of the Order of the British Empire
People from Rotorua